Roosevelt's shrew (Crocidura roosevelti) is a species of mammal in the family Soricidae. It is found in Angola, Cameroon, Central African Republic, Democratic Republic of the Congo, Rwanda, Tanzania, and Uganda. Its natural habitat is moist savanna.

References
 Hutterer, R. & Kerbis Peterhans, J. 2004.  Crocidura roosevelti.   2006 IUCN Red List of Threatened Species.   Downloaded on 30 July 2007.

Roosevelt's shrew
Fauna of Central Africa
Roosevelt's shrew
Taxonomy articles created by Polbot
Taxa named by Edmund Heller